Ch Ansir Iqbal Baryar (born May 10, 1972) was a Member of the Provincial Assembly of the Punjab (Pakistan) (2002–2007) and Chairman of the Standing Committee on Literacy and Non-Formal Basic Education.

Baryar was born at Sialkot to Ch Inayat Muhammad (father). He received an M.A. in Development Journalism in 2000 and Post Graduate Diploma in Development Support Commission in 1996 from University of the Punjab, Lahore.  He is also an industrialist engaged in import and export of sports goods.

He was elected to the Provincial Assembly in General Elections 2002 (Pakistan Muslim League party), and served as Chairman of the Literacy Committee since September 3, 2003.

External links
Provincial Assembly of the Punjab
New PML Punjab Officials, Daily Times (Pakistan)
Results of Punjab Provincial Assembly

Living people
1972 births